Siege of Rouen may refer to:

Siege of Rouen (1143-44), the siege and capture of the town by Geoffrey Plantagenet, Count of Anjou
Siege of Rouen (1204), the siege and capture of the town and castle by the French during the French annexation of Normandy
Siege of Rouen (1418-1419), the siege and capture of the town and castle by the English  during the Hundred Years' War
Siege of Rouen (1449), the siege and capture of the town and castle by the French during the Hundred Years’ War
Siege of Rouen (1562), the siege that set the stage for the main battle of the war at Dreux several months later
Siege of Rouen (1591-1592), the unsuccessful siege of the town and castle during the French Wars of Religion, by the Protestant King Henry IV of France